Dewey K. Warren (December 8, 1820 – October 11, 1866) was a doctor from Delafield, Wisconsin who served a single term as a member of the first Wisconsin State Assembly in the 1st Wisconsin Legislature of 1848.

Biography
Warren was born in Canada on December 8, 1820. He was a Democratic member of the Assembly during the 1848 session. He was also the Sheriff of Waukesha County, Wisconsin. He would be succeeded by fellow Democrat Albert Alden. Eventually becoming a physician, he and his wife Sarah, had one daughter, Ann. His brother, Stephen Warren, was also a member of the Assembly. Warred died on October 11, 1866, in Boston, Massachusetts and was buried in Hartland, Wisconsin.

References

External links
 

Pre-Confederation Canadian emigrants to the United States
People from Hartland, Wisconsin
Wisconsin sheriffs
Physicians from Wisconsin
1820 births
1866 deaths
Burials in Wisconsin
19th-century American politicians
Democratic Party members of the Wisconsin State Assembly